The Amatola barb (Enteromius amatolicus) is a species of cyprinid fish in the genus Enteromius.

It is endemic to South Africa, where it is threatened by the presence of invasive species and destruction of its habitat.

References 

Enteromius
Cyprinid fish of Africa
Freshwater fish of South Africa
Taxa named by Paul Harvey Skelton
Fish described in 1990